Thomas Bayard Young Jr. (June 8, 1907 – March 12, 1973) was an American football and baseball player, coach, and college athletics administrator.  He served as the head football coach at the University of North Carolina at Chapel Hill in 1943 and at Western Carolina University from 1946 to 1955, compiling a career college football record of 44–59–4.  Young was also the athletic director at Western Carolina from 1946 until his retirement in 1969.

Young was a native of Monroe, North Carolina.  He played college football at North Carolina in 1926 and 1927, where he was an all-Southern Conference halfback.  Young died at the age of 65 on March 12, 1973, at Baptist Hospital in Winston-Salem, North Carolina.

Head coaching record

College

References

External links
 

1907 births
1973 deaths
American football halfbacks
North Carolina Tar Heels baseball players
North Carolina Tar Heels football coaches
North Carolina Tar Heels football players
Western Carolina Catamounts athletic directors
Western Carolina Catamounts football coaches
High school football coaches in North Carolina
People from Union County, North Carolina
Players of American football from North Carolina
People from Winston-Salem, North Carolina